Downtown Charleston Historic District is a national historic district located at Charleston, West Virginia, USA. The district contains contributing structures in the Late Victorian and Late 19th and 20th Century Revivals architectural styles.  St. John's Episcopal Church (1884), the Basilica of the Co-Cathedral of the Sacred Heart (1897), and Woodrums' Building (1916) are  contributing properties.

It was listed on the National Register of Historic Places in 2006.

References

External links

The Scottish Rite of Charleston, West Virginia

Buildings and structures in Charleston, West Virginia
Historic districts in Charleston, West Virginia
National Register of Historic Places in Charleston, West Virginia
Victorian architecture in West Virginia
Historic districts on the National Register of Historic Places in West Virginia